Ormiston Park Academy, formerly the Belhus Chase Specialist Humanities College, is now a secondary school and academy located in Aveley, Essex, England. The school was reformed as an academy in 2009 under the sponsorship of the Ormiston Academies Trust and the new building was designed by Nicholas Hare Architects and completed in Spring 2014.

History 
The then Aveley County Technical High School first opened its doors in 1957 and originally had a capacity of 660 students. It amalgamated with the Grays County Technical High School in Grays, Essex to form the Aveley and Grays Technical High School in 1968. The Headmaster of the merged school was Frederick F. Harsant. The merger between the two schools discontinued when the Grays campus was taken over by the Grays Park School in 1971 and the Aveley Technical closed a year later when it amalgamated with the Palmer's Boys' and Girls' Schools to form Palmer's College.

In 1976 the Aveley School, located in Love Lane, relocated to the former Aveley Technical site. By 2004 it was called the Aveley Secondary School and in 2007 the school specialised as the Belhus Chase Specialist Humanities College. The Headteacher at the time was Tess Walker. In 2009 the school closed at the end of the August 31 school day, reopening the next day as Ormiston Park Academy. Tess Walker became Principal of the new academy and she left in 2014, being replaced by Huw Derrick. Derrick was Deputy Head since 2004 and announced his retirement in 2019, being replaced by current Principal Mark Roessler at the beginning of the 2020–2021 academic year.

Ofsted judgements

As of 2022, the school was last inspected by Ofsted in 2017, when it received a judgement of Good. Previously it was rated as Requires Improvement.

References

External links
Official website

Academies in Thurrock
Secondary schools in Thurrock
Ormiston Academies
Aveley